The Pataz Province is one of twelve provinces of the La Libertad Region in Peru. The capital of this province is the city of Tayabamba.

Political division
The province is divided into thirteen districts, which are:

 Buldibuyo
 Chillia
 Huancaspata
 Huaylillas
 Huayo
 Ongón
 Parcoy
 Pataz
 Pías
 Santiago de Challas
 Taurija
 Tayabamba
 Urpay

External links
  Official website of the Pataz province

Provinces of the La Libertad Region